Emma Jansson (born 9 May 1996) is a Swedish footballer who plays as a forward for Hammarby IF in Damallsvenskan. She has previously also represented Eskilstuna United and KIF Örebro DFF.

Club career
In November 2015, Jansson left Hammarby IF for Eskilstuna United. Jansson made 14 league appearances without scoring any goals and left the club following their UEFA Women's Champions League defeat by VfL Wolfsburg in November 2016. She then agreed to join KIF Örebro DFF.

Honors
Sweden U19
Winner
 UEFA Women's Under-19 Championship: 2015

References

External links 
 
 

1996 births
Living people
Swedish women's footballers
Hammarby Fotboll (women) players
Eskilstuna United DFF players
KIF Örebro DFF players
Damallsvenskan players
Women's association football midfielders